Ísak Óli Ólafsson (born 30 June 2000) is an Icelandic football centre-back, who currently plays for Esbjerg fB.

Club career
Ísak started his career with local club Keflavík before transferring to SønderjyskE in late August 2019. To gain more playing time, Ólafsson was loaned out to his former club Keflavík on 19 March 2021 until the end of July 2021.

On 20 June 2021, Ólafsson signed a three-year deal with Esbjerg fB.

International career
Ísak has featured for the U-16, U-17, U-19 and U-21 Icelandic youth national teams.

References

External links

2000 births
Living people
Icelandic footballers
Icelandic expatriate footballers
Iceland youth international footballers
Iceland under-21 international footballers
Iceland international footballers
Association football central defenders
Knattspyrnudeild Keflavík players
SønderjyskE Fodbold players
Esbjerg fB players
Danish Superliga players
Icelandic expatriate sportspeople in Denmark
Expatriate men's footballers in Denmark